Bai Jiajun (born 20 March 1991) is a Chinese football player who currently plays for Chinese Super League side Shanghai Shenhua as a left-back.

Club career
Born in Shanghai, Bai joined Genbao Football Academy in 2000 and was described by Academy's general manager Xu Genbao as being a hot prospect for the future. Bai was promoted to Shanghai East Asia squad in 2007 for the China League Two campaign. He made an impression within the team as Shanghai East Asia won promotion to the second tier at the end of the season. On 31 October 2008, he scored his first senior goal in a 4–1 away defeat against Jiangsu Sainty.

On 4 July 2012, Bai moved to Chinese Super League side Shanghai Shenhua on a 4-month loan deal. He made his Super League debut on 14 July, in a 3–1 home victory against Beijing Guoan. After that he would quickly establish himself within the team and became a regular starter at left-back. His first Super League goal came on 15 September which ensured Shanghai Shenhua beat Liaoning Whowin 3–0 at Hongkou Football Stadium. Bai transferred to Shanghai Shenhua permanently in February 2013. He extended his contract with the club for five years on 19 November 2017. On 7 March 2019, Bai was suspended for five matches, after an elbow to the head of Shanghai SIPG F.C. player Oscar in the Shanghai Derby. He was able to return for the final of the 2017 Chinese FA Cup against Shanghai SIPG that Shenhua went on to win.

International career
Bai was first called up into China U-17's squad in 2005. He was excluded from the squad for the 2006 AFC U-17 Championship in September 2006. In January 2010, Bai received his called up for China U-20 by Su Maozhen. He played as a regular starter for U-20s in the 2010 AFC U-19 Championship, however, China lost to North Korea U-20 in the Quarter-finals and couldn't qualify for 2011 FIFA U-20 World Cup. Bai moved up to China U-22 in April 2012, and was included in the squad for 2013 AFC U-22 Asian Cup qualification held by Laos in June 2012. He made his debut for U-22s in the opening match which China beat Laos 2–0. He made 3 appearances in the qualification as China U-22 finally qualified into the 2013 AFC U-22 Championship.

On 10 January 2017, Bai made his debut for Chinese national team in the 2017 China Cup against Iceland, coming on as a substitution for Deng Hanwen in the 65th minute.

Career statistics 
Statistics accurate as of match played 28 December 2021.

Honours

Club
Shanghai Shenhua
Chinese FA Cup: 2017, 2019

References

External links
 
 

1991 births
Living people
Chinese footballers
Footballers from Shanghai
Shanghai Port F.C. players
Shanghai Shenhua F.C. players
Chinese Super League players
China League One players
China League Two players
Association football defenders
China international footballers
21st-century Chinese people